Pu'an Signal Station is a railway station on the Taiwan Railways Administration (TRA) South-Link Line located in Daren Township, Taitung County, Taiwan.

Nearby stations
Taiwan Railway Administration
South-link Line
Fangshan - Fangye Signal - Central Signal - Puan Signal  - Guzhuang

See also
 List of railway stations in Taiwan

1992 establishments in Taiwan
Railway signal stations in Taiwan
Railway stations in Taitung County
Railway stations opened in 1992